was a Japanese football player. He played for Japan national team.

National team career
Otani was born in Hyogo Prefecture on August 31, 1912. In May 1934, when he was a Kobe University of Commerce student, he was selected Japan national team for 1934 Far Eastern Championship Games in Manila. At this competition, on May 13, he debuted against Dutch East Indies. He also played against Philippines and Republic of China. He played 3 games and scored 1 goal for Japan in 1934.

After retirement
After graduation from Kobe University of Commerce, Otani retired from playing career and he joined Toyo Boseki. He served as president from 1974 to 1978 and chairman from 1978 to 1983.

On November 23, 2007, Otani died of senility at the age of 95.

National team statistics

References

External links
 
 Japan National Football Team Database

1912 births
2007 deaths
Kobe University alumni
Association football people from Hyōgo Prefecture
Japanese footballers
Japan international footballers
Association football forwards